Events from the year 1855 in Russia

Incumbents
 Monarch – Nicholas I (until March 2), Alexander II (after March 2)

Events

 2 March- Alexander II becomes tsar after the death of his father, Nicholas I.

Births

Deaths

 
 
 March 2 - Nicholas I of Russia, monarch (b. 1796)
 July 15 - Euphrosinia Kolyupanovskaya, courtier (b. 1758)

References

1855 in Russia
Years of the 19th century in the Russian Empire